The 1956 Cornell Big Red football team was an American football team that represented Cornell University as a member of the Ivy League during the 1956 NCAA University Division football season. 

In its tenth season under head coach George K. James, the team compiled a 1–8 record and was outscored 209 to 100. Art Boland was the team captain. 

Cornell's 1–6 conference record ranked last in the Ivy League. This was the first season of formal play for the league, although the Big Red's previous  independent schedules, dating back to the 19th century, often featured future Ivy opponents. All seven Ivy matchups on Cornell's 1956 schedule had been present on the 1955 slate, as well (as had one of the non-conference opponents, Colgate).

Cornell played its home games at Schoellkopf Field in Ithaca, New York.

Schedule

References

Cornell
Cornell Big Red football seasons
Cornell Big Red football